The Grammy Award for Best R&B Performance is an award presented at the Grammy Awards, a ceremony that was established in 1958 and originally called the Gramophone Awards. According to the 54th Grammy Awards description guide it is designed for solo, duo/groups or collaborative (vocal or instrumental) R&B recordings and is limited to singles or tracks only.

The award was originally awarded from 1959 to 1961 as Best Rhythm & Blues Performance and then from 1962 to 1968 as Best Rhythm & Blues Recording before being discontinued. In 2012, the award was brought back combining the previous categories for Best Female R&B Vocal Performance, Best Male R&B Vocal Performance, Best R&B Performance by a Duo or Group with Vocal and Best Urban/Alternative Performance. The restructuring of these categories was a result of the Recording Academy's wish to decrease the list of categories and awards and to eliminate the distinctions between male and female performances, and between solo and duo/groups performances.

The award goes to the artist. The producer, engineer and songwriter can apply for a Winners Certificate.

Recipients 

 Each year is linked to the article about the Grammy Awards held that year.

Artists with multiple wins

5 wins
 Ray Charles

2 wins
 Beyoncé
 Bruno Mars
 Anderson .Paak

Artists with multiple nominations

5 nominations
 Ray Charles

4 nominations
 Beyoncé
 Daniel Caesar
 Sam Cooke
 Ledisi

3 nominations
 H.E.R.
 Anderson .Paak
 Usher

2 nominations
 LaVerne Baker
 Tamar Braxton
 James Brown
 Nat King Cole
 Lalah Hathaway
 Hiatus Kaiyote
 Etta James
 Jay-Z
 Lucky Daye
 Bruno Mars
 Miguel
 Lou Rawls
 Jazmine Sullivan
 Joe Tex

See also
Grammy Award for Best Traditional R&B Performance
Grammy Award for Best R&B Song

References

Grammy Awards for rhythm and blues
Awards established in 2012